Minoru Kawabata (川端実, Kawabata Minoru; born on May 22, 1911, died on June 29, 2001) was a Japanese artist. Kawabata is best known for his color field paintings. Between 1960 and 1981, Kawabata had 11 solo shows at the prominent Betty Parsons Gallery in New York. At the 31st Venice Biennale in 1962, Kawabata’s work was exhibited in the Japan Pavilion alongside that of four other Japanese artists. Kawabata has had solo exhibitions at the Everson Museum of Art in 1974, the Museum of Modern Art, Kamakura in 1975, the National Museum of Modern Art, Kyoto and Ohara Museum of Art in 1992, and Yokosuka Museum of Art in 2011. Kawabata’s works are in the collection of the Albright-Knox Art Gallery, Artizon Museum, Everson Museum of Art, Museum of Contemporary Art Tokyo, the Museum of Modern Art, Kamakura & Hayama, the Museum of Modern Art, São Paulo, the National Museum of Art, Osaka, the National Museum of Modern Art, Kyoto, the National Museum of Modern Art, Tokyo, the Newark Museum of Art, Ohara Museum of Art, Solomon R. Guggenheim Museum, Yokohama Museum of Art, Yokosuka Museum of Art, among others.

Biography

Early life and education (1911–1941) 
Kawabata was born on March 22, 1911, in Kasuga-chō, Koishikawa Ward, Tokyo. His father, Moshō Kawabata, was a Japanese-style painter and his grandfather, Gyokushō Kawabata, was a master painter of the Maruyama School. Despite his family's history of working in Japanese-style media, in April 1929, he enrolled in the oil painting department of the Tokyo School of Fine Arts, where he studied under Takeji Fujishima. One of Kawabata’s classmates was Taro Okamoto, but he left for France in the third term of his first year. Kawabata graduated from the Tokyo School of Fine Arts in 1934, his work was selected for the Bunten exhibition in 1936, and in 1939 he became a Kōfūkai (光風会) member. In August of the same year, he left for Europe. Soon after his arrival in Paris he was ordered to leave the country due to the outbreak of World War II. Initially he fled to New York, but after few months, Kawabata returned to France again. He then moved to Italy due to the escalation of the war, but when Italy also joined World War II he returned to Japan in September 1941.

War painting (1941–1945) 
Shortly after Kawabata's return from Europe, Japan was plunged into the Pacific War. Like many other artists, Kawabata was involved in producing war paintings. Kawabata’s war paintings were exhibited at the 1st Greater East Asian War Art Exhibition (大東亜戦争美術展) in 1942 and the 1st Army Art Exhibition (陸軍美術展) in 1943. Several of Kawabata’s war paintings are in the collection of the National Museum of Modern Art, Tokyo on indefinite loan from the United States.

Postwar Japan (1945–1958) 
After the war, from 1950 to 1955, Kawabata became a professor at Tama Art University, Tokyo, and during this time participated in the formation of an art group known as the New Creation Society (Shinseisaku Kyōkai; 新制作協会). In 1951, he was selected to represent Japan at the inaugural São Paulo Biennale. The notable Japanese critic Atsuo Imaizumi acclaimed Kawabata as "the first full-fledged international modern artist" produced by Japan. In 1953, together with Saburo Hasegawa, Jiro Yoshihara, Takeo Yamaguchi and others, Kawabata formed the Japan Abstract Art Club (日本アブストラクト・アート・クラブ). ln the 1950s he began to move away from figurative representation and to search for dynamic, abstract expression.

American years (1958–1994) 
In September 1958, Kawabata moved to the US and settled in New York, and the following month his Rhythm Brown (1958) received Honorable Mention at the 2nd Guggenheim International Award. In 1959, Kawabata was appointed as a professor at the New School for Social Research in New York. Kawabata held his first New York solo show at the Betty Parsons Gallery in 1960, forming an association which has continued ever since, with almost yearly exhibitions of his work. At the 31st Venice Biennale in 1962, Kawabata exhibited his works at the Japan Pavilion (commissioner: Atsuo Imaizumi) alongside that of four other artists (Kinuko Emi, Kumi Sugai, Tadashi Sugimata, and Ryōkichi Mukai). At the Venice Biennale, Kawabata exhibited eight works, including Vivid Red (1961), which is characterised by calligraphic brushwork and intense colours. Through the limited colour contrast of red and white, Vivid Red marked the completion of Kawabata's abstraction with powerful strokes. In the 1950s, Kawabata’s work was influenced by Abstract Expressionism that swept the New York art scene at that time, but from the end of  the 1960s his work developed into abstract paintings that emphasised colour fields and hard-edge geometric forms. Through the 1970s, Kawabata pursued abstraction, in which colour fields overlap in clear and simplified forms, such as diamonds, ellipses and origami-like shapes. The exhibition catalogue of his retrospective, held at the Everson Museum of Art in New York in 1974, interpreted: "Kawabata has consistently sought and won a powerfully individual mode of expression with lyrical color forms in space." "'I was too Westernized when I was a schoolboy,' he once said, 'Now I often think of my deep tradition. Then I try to produce something that is purely mine. I fight the traditions.' This strength of purpose is evident in his work and has won the respect of noted critics both in the United States and in Japan."

Later years (1994–2001) 
Kawabata had a large-scale touring retrospective at the National Museum of Modern Art, Kyoto and the Ohara Museum of Art in 1992, and returned to Japan in 1994, resettling in Tokyo. He died in a hospital in Shibuya Ward, Tokyo, on June 29, 2001, at the age of 90.

Selected exhibitions

Solo exhibitions 
1942 Ginza Mitsukoshi Department Store, Tokyo
1949 Hokusō Gallery (北荘画廊), Tokyo
1950 Hokusō Gallery, Tokyo
1951 Shiseidō Gallery (資生堂ギャラリー), Tokyo
1952 Takemiya Gallery (タケミヤ画廊), Tokyo
1954 Shiseidō Gallery, Tokyo
1956 Matsuya Ginza Department Store, Tokyo
1956 Fūgetsudō (風月堂), Tokyo
1958 Matsuya Ginza Department Store, Tokyo
1960 Betty Parsons Gallery, New York
1961 Galleria Apollinaire, Milan
1961 Betty Parsons Gallery, New York
1963 Betty Parsons Gallery, New York
1963 Tokyo Gallery (東京画廊), Tokyo
1965 Betty Parsons Gallery, New York
1967 Betty Parsons Gallery, New York
1969 Betty Parsons Gallery, New York
1971 Betty Parsons Gallery, New York
1972 Westbeth Courtyard Gallery, New York
1974 Everson Museum of Art, New York
1974 Betty Parsons Gallery, New York
1975 Minoru Kawabata (川端実展), The Museum of Modern Art, Kamakura
1977 Betty Parsons Gallery, New York
1978 Tokyo Gallery, Tokyo
1979 Root Gallery (ルートギャラリー), Tokyo
1980 Betty Parsons Gallery, New York
1981 Betty Parsons Gallery, New York
1983 Tokyo Gallery, Tokyo
1983 Jack Tilton Gallery, New York
1984 Jack Tilton Gallery, New York
1985 Jack Tilton Gallery, New York
1988 Jack Tilton Gallery, New York
1988 Virginia Miller Galleries, Florida
1989 Tokyo Gallery, Tokyo
1990 Jack Tilton Gallery, New York
1992 Minoru Kawabata (在米35年 孤高の軌跡: 川端実展), The National Museum of Modern Art, Kyoto and Ohara Museum of Art, Kurashiki
1994 Jack Tilton Gallery, New York
1997 Tokyo Gallery, Tokyo
2011 Minoru Kawabata (生誕100年 川端実展: 東京—ニューヨーク), Yokosuka Museum of Art
2020 Minoru Kawabata Form Fullness – From 35 Years of Work in New York (川端実 Form Fullness ― 在ニューヨーク35年の仕事から), Shibuya Hikarie 8/ (渋谷ヒカリエ8/), Tokyo

Group exhibitions 

1933 20th Kōfkūai Exhibition (光風会展)
1933 14th Teiten (帝展)
1938 2nd Bunten (文展)
1941 4th Shinbunten (新文展)
1942 1st Greater East Asian War Art Exhibition (大東亜戦争美術展), Tokyo Metropolitan Art Museum
1943 1st Army Art Exhibition (陸軍美術展), Toyo Metropolitan Art Museum
1951 Contemporary French Art Exhibition (現代フランス美術展), Nihonbashi Takashimaya Department Store, Tokyo
1951 3rd Japan Independent Exhibition (アンデパンダン展), Toyo Metropolitan Art Museum
1951 1st São Paulo Biennale
1952 Salon de Mai, Paris
1952 1st International Art Exhibition of Japan (日本国際美術展), Tokyo
1954 1st Contemporary Art Exhibition of Japan (現代日本美術展), Tokyo
1955 International Watercolor Exhibition: 18th Biennial, Brooklyn Museum
1956 Exposition Internationale de l’Art Actuel (世界・今日の美術展), Nihonbashi Takashimaya Department Story, Tokyo
1957 4th São Paulo Biennale
1958 Development of Modern Japanese Abstract Painting (抽象絵画の展開), The National Museum of Modern Art, Tokyo
1958 2nd Guggenheim International Award
1958 41st Pittsburgh International Exhibition of Contemporary Painting and Sculpture
1959 5th São Paulo Biennale
1959 XI Premio Lissone Internazionale per la Pittura, Lissone
1960 Six Japanese Painters, Gres Gallery, Washington, D.C.
1961 Carnegie International
1961 XII Premio Lissone Internazionale per la Pittura, Lissone
1962 Four American Painters, Molton Gallery, London
1962 Contemporary Painting Exhibition, Yale University Art Gallery, New Haven
1962 7th International Annual, University of Virginia, Mary Washington College
1962 31st Venice Biennale
1963 New Experiment in Art, deCordva Sculpture Park and Museum
1964 Oriental, Baltimore Museum of Art
1964 Carnegie International
1965 Exhibition of Japanese Artists Abroad: Europe and America (在外日本作家展: ヨーロッパとアメリカ), The National Museum of Modern Art, Tokyo
1965 The New Japanese Painting and Sculpture, San Francisco Museum of Modern Art and The Museum of Modern Art, New York
1967 Carnegie International
1969 Contemporary Painting and Sculpture, Bristol Art Museum, Rhode Islands
1973 Japanese Artist in the America (アメリカの日本作家), The National Museum of Modern Art, Tokyo and The National Museum of Modern Art, Kyoto
1973 Source of Inspiration, Betty Parsons Gallery, New York
1975 Large Works, Betty Parsons Gallery, New York
1980 Katachi: Form and Spirit in Japanese Art, Albuquerque Museum of Art and History, New Mexico
1981 1950s: Darkness and Light (1950年代: その暗黒と光芒), Tokyo Metropolitan Art Museum
1982 Betty Parsons Gallery, New York
1983 Tokyo Gallery in London: Juda Rowan Gallery’s Selection from Tokyo Gallery: Minoru Kawabata, Lee U-fan, Yoshishige Saito, Juda Rowan Gallery, London
1983 1960s: Departure for Diversification (1960年代: 多様化への出発), Tokyo Metropolitan Art Museum
1984 Twenty Years of Contemporary Paintings (現代絵画の20年), The Museum of Modern Art, Gunma
1985 Human Documents ’84/’85 (ヒューマン・ドキュメンツ ’84/’85), Tokyo Gallery
1988 42nd Western New York Exhibition, Albright-Knox Art Gallery, Buffalo
1990 Tokyo Avant-garde Forest 1946–1956 (東京アヴァンギャルドの森 1946–1956), Itabashi Art Museum, Tokyo
1992 Calligraphy and Painting, the Passionate Age: 1945-1969 (書と絵画の熱き時代: 1945－1969), O Art Museum (品川文化振興事業団O美術館), Tokyo
1994－1995 Japanese Art After 1945: Scream Against the Sky, Yokohama Museum of Art, Guggenheim Museum SoHo, and San Francisco Museum of Modern Art
1996 1964: A Turning Point in Japanese Art (日本の美術: よみがえる1964年), Museum of Contemporary Art Tokyo
1997 The World in Transition: Painting in Japan since 1945 (変貌する世界: 日本の現代絵画1945年以後), Takaoka Art Museum, Toyama and Yonago City Museum of Art, Tottori
2001 Through a Collector’s Eye: Japanese Art after 1945 (あるコレクターがみた戦後日本美術), The Museum of Modern Art, Gunma and The Museum of Art, Ehime
2002 Write Painting: Marks in Japanese Vein (日本的なもの: 書くこと描くこと), The Museum of Fine Arts, Gifu
2010 1960s Revisited, David Richard Contemporary, Santa Fe
2020 Powers of Painting: Selection from the Ohashi Collection (熱い絵画: 大橋コレクションに見る戦後日本美術の力), Nara Prefectural Museum of Art

Major public collections
Albright-Knox Art Gallery, Baffalo
Artizon Museum, Tokyo
Chiba City Museum of Art
Elder Gallery, Wesleyan University, Middletown
Everson Museum of Art, New York
Itabashi Art Museum, Tokyo
Kure Municipal Museum of Art
Museo d'Arte Contemporanea di Lissone
Museum of Contemporary Art Tokyo
The Museum of Fine Arts, Gifu
The Museum of Modern Art, Kamakura & Hayama
Museum of Modern Art, São Paulo
The National Museum of Art, Osaka
The National Museum of Modern Art, Kyoto
The National Museum of Modern Art, Tokyo
The Newark Museum of Art, New Jersey
Ohara Museum of Art, Kurashiki
Solomon R. Guggenheim Museum, New York
Takamatsu Art Museum
Tama Art University Museum, Tokyo
The University Art Museum, Tokyo University of the Arts
Yokohama Museum of Art
Yokosuka Museum of Art

Further reading 

Everson Museum of Art, ed. Kawabata, exh. cat., Syracuse, NY: Everson Museum of Art, 1974.
Harada, Osamu, and Shintani Masahiro, Nyūyōku no kawabata minoru = Kawabata in New York, Tokyo: Kōjī honpo, 1992.
The National Museum of Modern Art, Kyoto, and Ohara Museum of Art, eds. Zaibei 35-nen kokō no kiseki: Kawabata Minoru ten = Minoru Kawabata, exh. cat., Kyoto: National Museum of Modern Art, Kurashiki: Ohara Museum of Art, 1992.
Ono, Fuyuki, ed. Kawabata Minoru: Michiyuku kaiga = Minoru Kawabata: Form Fullness, Tokyo: Otsuka Fine Art, 2020.
Yokosuka Museum of Art, and Kudō Kasumi, eds. Seitan 100-nen Kawabata Minoru ten: Tōkyō—nyūyōku = Minoru Kawabata, exh. cat., Yokosuka: Yokosuka Museum of Art, 2011.

External links

Otsuka Fine Art

References

1911 births
2001 deaths
20th-century American painters
20th-century American male artists
American male painters
American artists of Japanese descent
Japanese emigrants to the United States
Japanese painters
Japanese contemporary artists
Artists from Tokyo
Abstract expressionist artists